Parliamentary elections were held in the Seychelles between 12 and 14 August 1963 for the Legislative Council of Seychelles

Campaign
For the first time, the Seychelles Taxpayers and Producers Association was challenged by another party, the Seychelles Islanders United Party.

Results
A total of 2,187 voters participated in the elections.

References

Seychelles
Elections in Seychelles
1963 in Seychelles
Election and referendum articles with incomplete results
August 1963 events in Africa